Sulla, Dharwad is a village in Dharwad district of Karnataka, India.

Demographics 
As of the 2011 Census of India there were 1,356 households in Sulla and a total population of 6,938 consisting of 3,558 males and 3,380 females. There were 818 children ages 0-6.

References

Villages in Dharwad district